Pedro e Inês is a Portuguese television series first aired on RTP1 in 2005, based on the story of Peter I of Portugal and Inês de Castro.

Cast
Pedro Laginha - D. Pedro
Ana Moreira - D. Inês
Nicolau Breyner - D. Afonso IV
Ana Bustorff - Beatriz de Castela
Leonor Seixas - D. Constança
Sofia de Portugal - Teresa Lourenço
Duarte Guimarães - Rodrigo
Fernanda Lapa - D. Maria
Adriano Carvalho - João Afonso
Paula Lobo Antunes - Maid Catarina
Filomena Gonçalves - Abadessa
Manuel Wiborg - Diogo Pacheco 
José Eduardo - Álvaro Pais
António Capelo - Lopo Fernandes
António Montez - Bispo de Lisboa
José Fidalgo - Pêro Coelho
Sofia Póvoas - Irmã Augusta

Production
It was filmed in Tomar and in the Alcobaça Monastery.

External links
 

This article includes content from the Portuguese Wikipedia article Pedro e Inês.

2005 Portuguese television series debuts
2005 Portuguese television series endings
Television series set in the 14th century
Period television series
Television shows filmed in Portugal
Cultural depictions of Inês de Castro